Vyacheslav Belov may refer to:
Vyacheslav Belov (pentathlete) (1938–2010), Soviet modern pentathlon competitor
Vyacheslav Belov (ice hockey) (born 1983), Russian ice hockey defenceman